Eikev, Ekev, Ekeb, Aikev, or Eqeb ( — Hebrew for "if [you follow]," the second word, and the first distinctive word in the parashah) is the 46th weekly Torah portion (parashah) in the annual Jewish cycle of Torah reading and the third in the Book of Deuteronomy. It comprises . The parashah tells of the blessings of obedience to God, the dangers of forgetting God, and directions for taking the Land of Israel. Moses recalls the making and re-making of the Tablets of Stone, the incident of the Golden Calf, Aaron's death, the Levites' duties, and exhortations to serve God.

The parashah is made up of 6,865 Hebrew letters, 1,747 Hebrew words, 111 verses, and 232 lines in a Torah Scroll (Sefer Torah). Jews generally read it in August or on rare occasion in late July.

Readings
In the (Hebrew Bible), Parashat Eikev has six "open portion" (petuchah) divisions (roughly equivalent to paragraphs, often abbreviated with the Hebrew letter  (peh)). Parashat Eikev has several further subdivisions, called "closed portions" (setumah) (abbreviated with the Hebrew letter  (samekh)) within the open portion divisions. The first open portion divides the first reading. The second open portion goes from the middle of the first reading to the middle of the second reading. The short third open portion is contained within the second reading. The fourth open portion starts in the second reading and contains all of the third reading. The fifth open portion corresponds to the fourth reading. And the sixth open portion spans the fifth, sixth, and seventh readings. A closed portion corresponds to the fifth reading. The sixth reading is divided into two closed portion divisions. And the short seventh reading corresponds to a final closed portion.

First reading — Deuteronomy 7:12–8:10
In the first reading (aliyah), Moses told the Israelites that if they obeyed God's rules, God would faithfully maintain the covenant, would bless them with fertility and agricultural productivity, and would ward off sickness. Moses directed the Israelites to destroy all the peoples whom God delivered to them, showing no pity and not worshiping their gods. A closed portion (setumah) ends here.

Moses told the Israelites not to fear these nations because they were numerous, for the Israelites had but to recall what God did to Pharaoh and the Egyptians and the wonders by which God liberated them. God would do the same to the peoples whom they feared, and would send a plague against them, too. God would dislodge those peoples little by little, so that the wild beasts would not take over the land. Moses directed the Israelites to burn the images of their gods, not to covet nor keep the silver and gold on them, nor to bring an abhorrent thing into their houses. The first open portion (petuchah) ends here with the end of chapter .

God made the Israelites travel the long way in the wilderness for an additional thirty-eight years (for a total of 40 years) because of their sin of unbelief and their rebellion after the twelve spies returned from reconnoitering Canaan, of whom ten gave a negative report about Israel's ability to take the land. God determined that none of that generation would enter the land which He had promised and so they remained in the wilderness until all that generation died. God subjected them to hunger and then gave them manna to teach them that man does not live on bread alone, but on what God decrees. Their clothes did not wear out, nor did their feet swell for 40 years. God disciplined them as a man disciplines his son. Moses told the Israelites that God was bringing them into a good land, where they might eat food without end, and thus when they had eaten their fill, they were to give thanks to God for the good land that God had given them. The first reading (aliyah) ends here.

Second reading — Deuteronomy 8:11–9:3
In the second reading (aliyah), Moses warned the Israelites not to forget God, not to violate God's commandments, and not to grow haughty and believe that their own power had won their wealth, but to remember that God gave them the power to prosper. The second open portion (petuchah) ends here.

Moses warned that if they forgot God and followed other gods, then they would certainly perish like the nations that God was going to displace from the land. The third open portion (petuchah) ends here with the end of chapter .

Moses warned the Israelites that they were to dispossess nations greater than they, but God would go before them as a devouring fire to drive out the land's inhabitants. The second reading (aliyah) ends here.

Third reading — Deuteronomy 9:4–29
In the third reading (aliyah), Moses warned the Israelites not to believe that God had enabled them to possess the land because of their own virtue; God was dispossessing the land's current inhabitants for two reasons: because of those nations' wickedness, and to fulfill the oath that God had made to Abraham, Isaac, and Jacob. Moses exhorted the Israelites to remember how they had provoked God to anger in the wilderness. At Horeb they so provoked God that God was angry enough to have destroyed them. Moses ascended the mountain, stayed for 40 days and nights, and consumed no bread or water. At the end of the 40 days, God gave Moses two stone tablets that God had inscribed with the covenant that God had addressed to the Israelites. God told Moses to hurry down, for the people whom Moses brought out of Egypt had acted wickedly and had made a molten image. God told Moses that God was inclined to destroy them and make of Moses a nation far more numerous than they. Moses started down the mountain with the two tablets in his hands, when he saw how the Israelites had made themselves a molten calf. Moses smashed the two tablets before their eyes, and threw himself down before God, fasting another 40 days and nights. God gave heed to Moses. God was angry enough with Aaron to have destroyed him, so Moses also interceded for Aaron. Moses burned the calf, ground it into dust, and threw its dust into the brook that came down from the mountain.

In the continuation of the reading, Moses reminded the Israelites how they provoked God at Taberah, at Massah, and at Kibroth-hattaavah. And when God sent them from Kadesh-barnea to take possession of the land, they flouted God's command and did not put their trust in God. When Moses lay prostrate before God those 40 days, because God was determined to destroy the Israelites, Moses prayed to God not to annihilate God's own people, whom God freed from Egypt, but to give thought to Abraham, Isaac, and Jacob and ignore the Israelites' sinfulness, else the Egyptians would say that God was powerless to bring them into the land that God had promised them. The third reading (aliyah) and the fourth open portion (petuchah) end here with the end of chapter .

Fourth reading — Deuteronomy 10:1–11
In the fourth reading (aliyah), God told Moses to carve out two tablets of stone like the first, come up the mountain, and make an ark of wood. God inscribed on the tablets the Ten Commandments that were on the first tablets that Moses had smashed, and Moses came down from the mountain and deposited the tablets in the Ark.

In the continuation of the reading, the Israelites marched to Moserah, where Aaron died and was buried, and his son Eleazar became priest in his stead. From there they marched to Gudgod, and on to Jotbath.
God set apart the Levites to carry the Ark of the Covenant, to stand in attendance upon the Tabernacle, and to bless in God's Name, and that was why the Levites were to receive no portion of the land, as God was their portion.

Fifth reading — Deuteronomy 10:12–11:9
In the fifth reading (aliyah), Moses exhorted the Israelites to revere God, to walk only in God's paths, to love God, to serve God with all their heart and soul, and to keep God's commandments. Moses noted that although heaven and earth belong to God, God was drawn to love their fathers, so that God chose the Israelites from among all peoples. Moses described God as supreme, great, mighty, and awesome, showing no favor and taking no bribe, but upholding the cause of the fatherless and the widow, and befriending the stranger. Moses thus instructed the Israelites to befriend the stranger, for they were strangers in Egypt. Moses exhorted the Israelites to revere God, worship only God, and swear only by God's name, for God was their glory, who performed for them marvelous deeds, and made them as numerous as the stars. Moses exhorted the Israelites to love God and always keep God's commandments. Moses asked the Israelites to note that they themselves witnessed the signs that God performed in Egypt against Pharaoh, what God did to Egypt's army, how God rolled upon them the waters of the Sea of Reeds, what God did for them in the wilderness, and what God did to Dathan and Abiram when the earth swallowed them. Moses instructed them therefore to keep all the law so that they might have the strength to enter and possess the land and long endure on that land flowing with milk and honey. The fifth reading (aliyah) and a closed portion (setumah) end here.

Sixth reading — Deuteronomy 11:10–21

In the sixth reading (aliyah), Moses extolled the promised land as a land of hills and valleys that soaks up its water from the rains, a land that God looks after. He contrasted this with Egypt, which was dependent on irrigation. A closed portion (setumah) end here.

Then Moses told them words now found in the Shema prayer: If the Israelites obeyed the commandments, loving God and serving God with heart and soul, God would grant the rain in season and they would gather their grain, wine, and oil. God would provide grass for their cattle and the Israelites would eat their fill. Moses warned them not to be lured away to serve other gods, for God's anger would flare up against them, God would suspend the rain, and they would soon perish from the land. Moses urged them to impress God's words upon their heart, bind them as a sign on their hands, let them serve as a symbol on their foreheads, teach them to their children, and recite them when they stayed at home and when they were away, when they lay down and when they got up. Moses instructed them to inscribe God's words on the doorposts of their houses and on their gates, so that they and their children might endure in the land that God swore to their fathers as long as there is a heaven over the earth. The sixth reading (aliyah) and a closed portion (setumah) end here.

Seventh reading — Deuteronomy 11:22–25
In the seventh reading (aliyah), which is also the concluding maftir reading, Moses promised that if the Israelites faithfully kept the law, loving God, walking in all God's ways, and holding fast to God, then God would dislodge the nations then in the land, and every spot on which their feet tread would be theirs, and their territory would extend from the wilderness to Lebanon and from the Euphrates to the Mediterranean Sea. Parashat Eikev and a closed portion (setumah) end here.

Readings according to the triennial cycle
Jews who read the Torah according to the triennial cycle of Torah reading read the parashah according to the following schedule:

In ancient parallels
The parashah has parallels or is discussed in these ancient sources:

Deuteronomy chapter 9
John A. Wilson suggested that the Anakim may be related to the Iy-‘anaq geographic region named in Middle Kingdom Egyptian (19th to 18th century BCE) pottery bowls that had been inscribed with the names of enemies and then shattered as a kind of curse.

Deuteronomy chapter 11
Figs were in it and grapes. It had more wine than water. Abundant was its honey, plentiful its oil. All kind of fruit were on its trees. Barley was there and emmer, and no end of cattle of all kinds."

In translation

Deuteronomy chapter 7
The King James Version says 'if ye hearken to these judgments ...', the Orthodox Jewish Bible, a Messianic text not to be confused with those of Orthodox Judaism, says 'if you give heed ...' and the New International Version has 'if you pay attention ...' whereas the American Standard Version states 'because ye hearken ...' and the New King James Version has 'because you listen ...'. The Cambridge Bible for Schools and Colleges argues that 'because' is a better translation and the Pulpit Commentary notes that 'the Hebrew conveys the idea of a reward as consequent on their hearkening; as there would be retribution for transgression, so would there be recompense for obedience'. The Jerusalem Bible reflects this 'recompense' interpretation in its translation: "Listen to these ordinances, be true to them and observe them, and in return Yahweh your God will be true to the covenant and love which he promised on oath to your ancestors".

In inner-Biblical interpretation
The parashah has parallels or is discussed in these Biblical sources:

Deuteronomy chapter 7

Deuteronomy chapter 9
Commentators suggest that the same words are used because 'a fresh portion of the exhortation begins here', or because this was 'a new discourse, delivered at some distance of time from the former, probably on the next sabbath day'.

1 Kings  reports a parallel story of golden calves. King Jeroboam of the northern Kingdom of Israel made two calves of gold out of a desire to prevent the kingdom from returning to allegiance to the house of David and the southern Kingdom of Judah. In , the people said of the Golden Calf, "This is your god, O Israel, that brought you up out of the land of Egypt." Jeroboam set up one of the calves in Bethel, and the other in Dan, and the people went to worship before the calf in Dan. Jeroboam made houses of high places, and made priests from people who were not Levites. He ordained a feast like Sukkot on the fifteenth day of the eighth month (a month after the real Sukkot), and he went up to the altar at Bethel to sacrifice to the golden calves that he had made, and he installed his priests there.

In  and  Moses called on God to remember God's covenant with Abraham, Isaac, and Jacob to deliver the Israelites from God's wrath after the incident of the Golden Calf.

Deuteronomy chapter 10
 assigns the Levites the duties of bearing the Ark of the Covenant, to stand before God to minister to God, and to bless in God's name. Elsewhere in the Hebrew Bible,  reports that Levites taught the law.  reports that they served as judges.  reports that of 38,000 Levite men age 30 and up, 24,000 were in charge of the work of the Temple in Jerusalem, 6,000 were officers and magistrates, 4,000 were gatekeepers, and 4,000 praised God with instruments and song.  reports that King David installed Levites as singers with musical instruments, harps, lyres, and cymbals, and  reports that David appointed Levites to minister before the Ark, to invoke, to praise, and to extol God, and  reports that at the inauguration of Solomon's Temple, Levites sang dressed in fine linen, holding cymbals, harps, and lyres, to the east of the altar, and with them 120 priests blew trumpets.  reports that Levites of the sons of Kohath and of the sons of Korah extolled God in song. Eleven Psalms identify themselves as of the Korahites.

 reports that God “executes justice for the fatherless and widow.” God's justice is a recurring theme in the Hebrew Bible (Tanakh). In , Abraham asked, “Shall not the Judge of all the earth do justly?” In Psalm , the Psalmist tells God, “You have maintained my right and my cause; You sat upon the throne as the righteous Judge.”  reports that God “loves righteousness and justice.” In , the Psalmist tells God, “Righteousness and justice are the foundation of Your throne.”  says that God “executes righteousness, and acts of justice for all who are oppressed”;  ( in the KJV) says that God “will maintain the cause of the poor, and the right of the needy”; and  says that God “executes justice for the oppressed.” And , quotes God saying, “I will make justice the line, and righteousness the plummet.” Professor Steven Schwarzschild of Washington University in St. Louis in the mid-20th century concluded in the Encyclopaedia Judaica that “God’s primary attribute of action . . . is justice” and “Justice has widely been said to be the moral value which singularly characterizes Judaism.”

In , Moses reported that God had made the Israelites as numerous as the stars. In , God promised that Abraham's descendants would be as numerous as the stars of heaven. In , God reminded Isaac that God had promised Abraham that God would make his heirs as numerous as the stars. In , Jacob reminded God that God had promised that Jacob's descendants would be as numerous as the sands. In , Moses reminded God that God had promised to make the Patriarch's descendants as numerous as the stars. In , Moses reported that God had multiplied the Israelites until they were then as numerous as the stars. And  foretold that the Israelites would be reduced in number after having been as numerous as the stars.

In early nonrabbinic interpretation
The parashah has parallels or is discussed in these early nonrabbinic sources:

Deuteronomy chapter 8
Philo saw in  accusations against "the self-loving man." Philo cited Cain as an example of one who (in ) showed his gratitude to God too slowly. Philo taught that we should hurry to please God without delay. Thus  enjoins, "If you vow a vow, you shall not delay to perform it." Philo explained that a vow is a request to God for good things, and  thus enjoins that when one has received them, one must offer gratitude to God as soon as possible. Philo divided those who fail to do so into three types: (1) those who forget the benefits that they have received, (2) those who pridefully see themselves and not God as the authors of what they receive, and (3) those who realize that God caused what they received, but still say that they deserved it, because they are worthy to receive God's favor. Philo taught that Scripture opposes all three. Philo wrote that  replies to the first group who forget, "Take care, lest when you have eaten and are filled, and when you have built fine houses and inhabited them, and when your flocks and your herds have increased, and when your silver and gold, and all that you possess is multiplied, you be lifted up in your heart, and forget the Lord your God." Philo taught that one does not forget God when one remembers one's own nothingness and God's exceeding greatness. Philo interpreted  to reprove those who look upon themselves as the cause of what they have received, telling them: "Say not my own might, or the strength of my right hand has acquired me all this power, but remember always the Lord your God, who gives you the might to acquire power." And Philo read  to address those who think that they deserve what they have received, saying, "You do not enter into this land to possess it because of your righteousness, or because of the holiness of your heart; but, in the first place, because of the iniquity of these nations, since God has brought on them the destruction of wickedness; and in the second place, that He may establish the covenant that He swore to our Fathers." Philo interpreted the term "covenant" figuratively to mean God's graces. Thus Philo concluded that if we discard forgetfulness, ingratitude, and self-love, we will no longer through delay miss attaining the genuine worship of God, but we shall meet God, having prepared ourselves to do what God commands us.

In classical Rabbinic interpretation
The parashah is discussed in these rabbinic sources from the era of the Mishnah and the Talmud:

Deuteronomy chapter 7
The iniquity of my footsteps encompasses me." The Midrash taught that people sometimes fail to observe minor commandments, thus trampling those commandments beneath their heels. The Midrash thus taught that the Psalmist feared the day of judgment because he may have trampled minor commandments.

Israel asked God when God would grant reward for the observance of commandments. God replied that when people observe commandments, they enjoy some fruits now, but God will give them their full reward in the end, after death.

Rabbi Bibi ben Giddal said that Simeon the Just taught that the law prohibited a Jew from robbing a non-Jew, although a Jew could take possession of a non-Jew's lost article. Rav Huna read  to prohibit a Jew from robbing a non-Jew, because  provided that the Israelites were to take from the enemies that God would deliver to them in time of war, thus implying that the Israelites could not take from non-Jews in time of peace, when God had not delivered them into the Israelites' hands.

But a Baraita taught that the hornet did not pass over the Jordan River with the Israelites. Rabbi Simeon ben Lakish reconciled the two sources, explaining that the hornet stood on the eastern bank of the Jordan and shot its venom over the river at the Canaanites. The venom blinded the Canaanites' eyes above and castrated them below, as  says, "Yet destroyed I the Amorite before them, whose height was like the height of the cedars, and he was strong as the oaks; yet I destroyed his fruit from above and his roots from beneath." Rav Papa offered an alternative explanation, saying that there were two hornets, one in the time of Moses and the other in the time of Joshua. The former did not pass over the Jordan, but the latter did.

The Rabbis told the story that God, Daniel, and Nebuchadnezzar conspired to keep Daniel out of the fiery furnace. God said: "Let Daniel depart, lest people say that Hananiah, Mishael, and Azariah were delivered through Daniel's merit instead of their own." Daniel said: "Let me go, so that I will not become a fulfillment of the words (in ), ‘the graven images of their gods you shall burn with fire.'" And Nebuchadnezzar said: "Let Daniel depart, lest people say that the king has burned his god in fire."

But the Mekhilta noted that  says, "You shall not covet the silver or the gold that is on them, nor take it for yourself." And the Mekhilta reasoned that just as in  the word "covet" applies only to prohibit the carrying out of one's desire into practice, so also  (20:14 in NJSP) prohibits only the carrying out of one's desire into practice.

Deuteronomy chapter 8
The Mishnah taught that first fruits were brought only from the Seven Species (Shiv'at Ha-Minim) that  noted to praise the Land of Israel: wheat, barley, grapes, figs, pomegranates, olive-oil, and date-honey. But first fruits could not be brought from dates grown on hills, or from valley-fruits, or from olives that were not of the choice kind.

Rabbi Awira told — sometimes in the name of Rabbi Ammi, and sometimes in the name of Rabbi Assi — that the angels asked God whether God was not showing favor to Israel. And God asked the angels how God could not show favor to Israel, when  required them to bless God when they had eaten and were satisfied, but the Israelites bless God even when they have eaten only the quantity of an olive or an egg.

Rabbi Johanan deduced from  that people who are haughty of spirit are as though they had denied the fundamental principle of God's existence. And Rav Nachman bar Yitzchak found in  a prohibition for haughtiness of spirit. For Rabbi Abin said in the name of Rabbi Ilai that wherever it is stated "Beware, lest" (as it does in ) the reference is to a prohibition.

In , the heart becomes proud. A Midrash catalogued the wide range of additional capabilities of the heart reported in the Hebrew Bible. The heart speaks, sees, hears, walks, falls, stands, rejoices, cries, is comforted, is troubled, becomes hardened, grows faint, grieves, fears, can be broken, rebels, invents, cavils, overflows, devises, desires, goes astray, lusts, is refreshed, can be stolen, is humbled, is enticed, errs, trembles, is awakened, loves, hates, envies, is searched, is rent, meditates, is like a fire, is like a stone, turns in repentance, becomes hot, dies, melts, takes in words, is susceptible to fear, gives thanks, covets, becomes hard, makes merry, acts deceitfully, speaks from out of itself, loves bribes, writes words, plans, receives commandments, acts with pride, makes arrangements, and aggrandizes itself.

The Pesikta de-Rav Kahana cited  for the proposition that God's fate and Israel's fate are intertwined. According to Bar Kappara, God told Israel that the time of God's redemption (when God would release God's right hand, which was restrained while Israel is in exile) was in Israel's hand, and the time of Israel's redemption was in God's hand. To Rabbi Dosa, this verse meant that God said that if God forgot Jerusalem, God's right hand would forget how to perform miracles (and God would thus cease to be God).

A Midrash taught that God told the Israelites that during all the 40 years that they spent in the wilderness, God did not make it necessary for them to escape. Rather, God cast their enemies down before them. As  reports, there were numerous snakes, fiery serpents, and scorpions in the wilderness, but God did not allow them to harm the Israelites. Thus, God told Moses to write down in  the stages by which Israel journeyed in the wilderness, so that they would know the miracles that God had done for them.

One of the paths began with clear ground but ended in thorns. The other began with thorns but ended in clear ground. The person would tell passersby that the path that appeared clear would be fine for two or three steps, but end in thorns, and the path that began with thorns would be difficult for two or three steps, but end in clear ground. So, said the Sifre, Moses told Israel that one might see the wicked flourish in this world for a short time, but in the end they will have occasion to regret. And the righteous who are distressed in this world will in the end have occasion for rejoicing, as  says, “that He might prove you, to do you good at the end.”

Deuteronomy chapter 9

Moses gave the Israelites the opportunity to pray for him, but they did not. The Midrash compared this to a king who had many children by a noble lady. The lady was undutiful to him and he decided to divorce her. He told her that he was going to marry another wife. She asked who, and he told her. She summoned her children and told them that their father intended to divorce her and marry the other woman, and asked the children if they could bear being subjected to her. She thought that perhaps they would understand what she meant and would intercede with their father on her behalf, but they did not understand. As they did not understand, she commanded them only for their own sake to be mindful of the honor of their father. So it was with Moses.

A Baraita taught that because of God's displeasure with the Israelites, the north wind did not blow on them in any of the 40 years during which they wandered in the wilderness.

Rabbi Hanina taught that Moses neither sat nor stood, but bowed. Rava taught that Moses learned the easy things standing and the hard ones sitting.

A Midrash explained why Moses broke the stone tablets. When the Israelites committed the sin of the Golden Calf, God sat in judgment to condemn them, as  says, "Let Me alone, that I may destroy them," but God had not yet condemned them. So Moses took the tablets from God to appease God's wrath. The Midrash compared the act of Moses to that of a king's marriage-broker. The king sent the broker to secure a wife for the king, but while the broker was on the road, the woman corrupted herself with another man. The broker (who was entirely innocent) took the marriage document that the king had given the broker to seal the marriage and tore it, reasoning that it would be better for the woman to be judged as an unmarried woman than as a wife.

In , Moses foretold that "A prophet will the Lord your God raise up for you . . . like me," and Rabbi Johanan thus taught that prophets would have to be, like Moses, strong, wealthy, wise, and meek. Strong, for  says of Moses, "he spread the tent over the tabernacle," and a Master taught that Moses himself spread it, and  reports, "Ten cubits shall be the length of a board." Wealthy, as  reports God's instruction to Moses, "Carve yourself two tablets of stone," and the Rabbis interpreted the verse to teach that the chips would belong to Moses. Wise, for Rav and Samuel both said that 50 gates of understanding were created in the world, and all but one were given to Moses, for  said of Moses, "You have made him a little lower than God." Meek, for  reports, "Now the man Moses was very meek."

The words "In the wilderness" alludes to the Golden Calf, as  reports. "On the plain" alludes to how they complained about not having water, as  reports. "Facing Suf" alludes to how they rebelled at the Sea of Reeds (or some say to the idol that Micah made). Rabbi Judah cited , "They rebelled at the Sea of Reeds." "Between Paran" alludes to the Twelve Spies, as  says, "Moses sent them from the wilderness of Paran." "And Tophel" alludes to the frivolous words (tiphlot) they said about the manna. "Lavan" alludes to Koraḥ's mutiny. "Ḥatzerot" alludes to the quails. And "Di-zahav" alludes to when Aaron said to them: "Enough (dai) of this golden (zahav) sin that you have committed with the Calf!" But Rabbi Eliezer ben Ya'akov said it means "Terrible enough (dai) is this sin that Israel was punished to last from now until the resurrection of the dead."

The school of Rabbi Yannai deduced from the word Di-zahab that Moses spoke insolently towards heaven. The school of Rabbi Yannai taught that Moses told God that it was because of the silver and gold (zahav) that God showered on the Israelites until they said "Enough" (dai) that the Israelites made the Golden Calf. They said in the school of Rabbi Yannai that a lion does not roar with excitement over a basket of straw but over a basket of meat. Rabbi Oshaia likened it to the case of a man who had a lean but large-limbed cow. The man gave the cow good feed to eat and the cow started kicking him. The man deduced that it was feeding the cow good feed that caused the cow to kick him. Rabbi Hiyya bar Abba likened it to the case of a man who had a son and bathed him, anointed him, gave him plenty to eat and drink, hung a purse round his neck, and set him down at the door of a brothel. How could the boy help sinning? Rav Aha the son of Rav Huna said in the name of Rav Sheshet that this bears out the popular saying that a full stomach leads to a bad impulse. As  says, "When they were fed they became full, they were filled and their heart was exalted; therefore they have forgotten Me."

A Midrash recounted how at first (after the incident of the Golden Calf), God pronounced a decree against Aaron, as  says, "The Lord was very angry with Aaron to have destroyed (le-hashmid) him." But, as Rabbi Joshua ben Levi taught, prayer effects half atonement. So when Moses prayed on Aaron's behalf, God annulled half the decree. Aaron's two sons Nadab and Abihu died, and Aaron's two other sons remained. Thus  says, "And the Lord spoke to Moses, saying: ‘Take Aaron and his sons'" (implying that they were to be saved from death).

The Pirke De-Rabbi Eliezer told that after the incident of the Golden Calf, God told Moses that the Israelites had forgotten God's might and had made an idol. But Moses noted that once the Israelites had sinned, God told Moses (in ), "Go, get down, for your people have corrupted themselves." Moses told God that the Israelites were indeed God's people, and God's inheritance, as  reports Moses saying, "Yet they are Your people and Your inheritance."

Deuteronomy chapter 10
The Midrash noted that the Rabbis taught that documents of betrothal and marriage are written only with the consent of both parties, and the bridegroom pays the scribe's fee.

The Rabbis taught that  bears out , “A time to cast away stones, and a time to gather stones together.” The Rabbis taught that  refers to Moses.

The Rabbis explained that God commanded Moses to carve two Tablets in  because the two Tablets were to act as witnesses between God and Israel. The two Tablets corresponded to the two witnesses whom  and  require to testify to a cause, to two groomsmen, to bridegroom and bride, to heaven and earth, to this world and the World To Come.

Rav Joseph reasoned that the two mentionings of the Tablets teaches that both the Tablets and the fragments of the Tablets that Moses broke were deposited in the Ark. Rav Joseph deduced from this that a scholar who has forgotten his learning through no fault of his own (through old age, sickness, or trouble, but not through willful neglect) is still due respect (by analogy to the broken pieces of the tablets that the Israelites nonetheless treated with sanctity).

Resh Lakish deduced from the interjection of the apparently parenthetical words, "which you broke," in  that God was thereby saying to Moses that Moses did well to break them.

The Pirke De-Rabbi Eliezer taught that Jacob wished to ford the Jabbok River and was detained there by an angel, who asked Jacob whether Jacob had not told God (in ), "Of all that you shall give me I will surely give a tenth to You." So Jacob gave a tenth of all the cattle that he had brought from Paddan Aram. Jacob had brought some 5,500 animals, so his tithe came to 550 animals. Jacob again tried to ford the Jabbok, but was hindered again. The angel once again asked Jacob whether Jacob had not told God (in ), "Of all that you shall give me I will surely give a tenth to You." The angel noted that Jacob had sons and that Jacob had not given a tithe of them. So Jacob set aside the four firstborn sons (whom the law excluded from the tithe) of each of the four mothers, and eight sons remained. He began to count from Simeon, and included Benjamin, and continued the count from the beginning. And so Levi was reckoned as the tenth son, and thus the tithe, holy to God, as  says, "The tenth shall be holy to the Lord." So the angel Michael descended and took Levi and brought him up before the Throne of Glory and told God that Levi was God's lot. And God blessed him, that the sons of Levi should minister on earth before God, as directed in  like the ministering angels in heaven.

Rabbi Hanina deduced from  that everything is in the hand of Heaven except the fear of Heaven, for  says: "What does the Lord your God ask of you, but only to fear the Lord your God." The Gemara asked whether the fear of Heaven was such a little thing that  says "only." Rabbi Hanina said in the name Rabbi Simeon ben Yohai that God has in God's treasury nothing but a store of the fear of Heaven, as  says: "The fear of the Lord is His treasure," and thus the fear of Heaven must be a great thing. The Gemara responded that for Moses, the fear of Heaven was a small thing, for he had it. Rabbi Hanina illustrated with a parable: If a man is asked for a big article and he has it, it seems like a small article to him; if he is asked for a small article and he does not have it, it seems like a big article to him.

And just as  says, “The Lord is righteous,” we, too, should be righteous.

Rav Awira (or some say Rabbi Joshua ben Levi) taught that the Evil Inclination has seven names.

Rav Zeira taught that all the nations are uncircumcised in each of the first four ways, and all the house of Israel are uncircumcised in heart, in that their hearts do not allow them to do God's will. And Rav Zeira taught that in the future, God will take away from Israel the uncircumcision of their hearts, and they will not harden their stubborn hearts anymore before their Creator, as  says, "And I will take away the stony heart out of your flesh, and I will give you an heart of flesh," and  says, "And you shall be circumcised in the flesh of your foreskin."

Rabbi Joshua ben Levi said that the men of the Great Assembly were so called because they restored the crown of the divine attributes — the enumeration of God's praise — to its ancient completeness. But the men of the Great Assembly came and said that these circumstances showed God's mighty deeds, because God suppressed God's wrath, extending longsuffering to the wicked. And these circumstances showed God's awesome powers, for but for the fear of God, how could the single nation of Israel survive among the many nations. The Gemara asked how Jeremiah and Daniel could alter words established by Moses. Rabbi Eleazar said that since Jeremiah and Daniel knew that God insists on truth, they did not want to ascribe false attributions to God.

Rabbi Eliezer the Great taught that the Torah warns against wronging a stranger in 36, or others say 46, places (including ). The Gemara taught that thus a proverb says: If there is a case of hanging in a person's family history, do not say to the person, "Hang up this fish for me."
A person privileged to study the Torah is thus privileged to perform God's precepts. Moreover, converts' daughters could marry into the priesthood, so that their descendants could offer burnt-offerings on the altar. The Midrash offered another interpretation: "Bread" refers to the showbread, while "clothing" refers to the priestly vestments. The Midrash offered yet another interpretation: "Bread" refers to challah, while "clothing" refers to the first shearings of the sheep, both of which belong to the priests.

The Midrash compared God's great love of converts to a king who had a flock of goats, and once a stag came in with the flock. When the king was told that the stag had joined the flock, the king felt an affection for the stag and gave orders that the stag have good pasture and drink and that no one beat him. When the king's servants asked him why he protected the stag, the king explained that the flock have no choice, but the stag did. The king accounted it as a merit to the stag that had left behind the whole of the broad, vast wilderness, the abode of all the beasts, and had come to stay in the courtyard, in like manner, God provided converts with special protection, for God exhorted Israel not to harm them, as  says, “Love therefore the convert,” and  says, “And a convert shall you not oppress.”

The Gemara deduced from  that it is a positive commandment to fear God.

A Midrash taught that the Israelites were counted on ten occasions: (1) when they went down to Egypt (as reported in ), (2) when they went up out of Egypt, (3) at the first census in Numbers, (4) at the second census in Numbers, (5) once for the banners, (6) once in the time of Joshua for the division of the Land of Israel, (7) once by Saul, (8) a second time by Saul, (9) once by David, and (10) once in the time of Ezra.

Deuteronomy chapter 11
Once when Rami bar Ezekiel visited Bnei Brak, he saw goats grazing under fig trees while honey was flowing from the figs, and milk dripped from the goats mingling with the fig honey, causing him to remark that it was indeed a land flowing with milk and honey. Rabbi Jacob ben Dostai said that it is about three miles from Lod to Ono, and once he rose up early in the morning and waded all that way up to his ankles in fig honey. Resh Lakish said that he saw the flow of the milk and honey of Sepphoris extend over an area of sixteen miles by sixteen miles. Rabbah bar bar Hana said that he saw the flow of the milk and honey in all the Land of Israel and the total area was equal to an area of twenty-two parasangs by six parasangs.

Already at the time of the Mishnah,  constituted the second part of a standard Shema prayer that the priests recited daily, following  and preceding .

Rabbi Joshua ben Korhah taught that the Shema prayer puts  before  so that those who say the prayer should first accept upon themselves the yoke of Heaven's sovereignty and then take upon themselves the yoke of the commandments. And  comes before  because  applies both day and night (since it mentions all the commandments), whereas  is applicable only to the day (since it mentions only the precept of the fringes, which is not obligatory at night).

Reading , "To love the Lord your God and to serve Him with all your heart," a Baraita equated service of the heart with prayer. And that  mentions rain immediately thereafter indicates that it is appropriate to pray for rain.

The Mishnah taught that the absence of one of the two portions of scripture in the mezuzah —  and  — invalidates the other, and indeed even one imperfect letter can invalidates the whole.

The Rabbis in a Baraita questioned what was to be learned from the words of  "And you shall gather in your corn and wine and oil." Rabbi Ishmael replied that since  says, "This book of the law shall not depart out of your mouth, but you shall meditate therein day and night," one might think that one must take this injunction literally (and study Torah every waking moment). Therefore,  directs one to "gather in your corn," implying that one should combine Torah study with a worldly occupation. Rabbi Simeon ben Yohai questioned that, however, asking if a person plows in plowing season, sows in sowing season, reaps in reaping season, threshes in threshing season, and winnows in the season of wind, when would one find time for Torah? Rather, Rabbi Simeon ben Yohai taught that when Israel performs God's will, others perform its worldly work, as  says, "And strangers shall stand and feed your flocks, aliens shall be your plowmen and vine-trimmers; while you shall be called ‘Priests of the Lord,' and termed ‘Servants of our God.'" And when Israel does not perform God's will, it has to carry out its worldly work by itself, as  says, "And you shall gather in your corn." And not only that, but the Israelites would also do the work of others, as  says, "And you shall serve your enemy whom the Lord will let loose against you. He will put an iron yoke upon your neck until He has wiped you out." Abaye observed that many had followed Rabbi Ishmael's advice to combine secular work and Torah study and it worked well, while others have followed the advice of Rabbi Simeon ben Yohai to devote themselves exclusively to Torah study and not succeeded. Rava would ask the Rabbis (his disciples) not to appear before him during Nisan (when corn ripened) and Tishrei (when people pressed grapes and olives) so that they might not be anxious about their food supply during the rest of the year.

Rav Judah taught in the name of Rav that one is forbidden to eat before giving food to one's animals, as  says, "And I will give grass in your fields for your cattle," and only after that does  say, "you shall eat and be satisfied."

The Rabbis taught in a Baraita that  says of the Torah, "So you fix (ve-samtem) these My words in your heart and in your soul." The Rabbis taught that one should read the word samtem rather as sam tam (meaning "a perfect remedy"). The Rabbis thus compared the Torah to a perfect remedy. The Rabbis compared this to a man who struck his son a strong blow, and then put a compress on the son's wound, telling his son that so long as the compress was on his wound, he could eat and drink at will, and bathe in hot or cold water, without fear. But if the son removed the compress, his skin would break out in sores. Even so, did God tell Israel that God created the Evil Inclination (yetzer hara), but also created the Torah as its antidote. God told Israel that if they occupied themselves with the Torah, they would not be delivered into the hand of the Evil Inclination, as  says: "If you do well, shall you not be exalted?" But if Israel did not occupy themselves with the Torah, they would be delivered into the hand of the Evil Inclination, as  says: "sin couches at the door." Moreover, the Rabbis taught, the Evil Inclination is altogether preoccupied to make people sin, as  says: "and to you shall be his desire." Yet if one wishes, one can rule over the Evil Inclination, as  says: "and you shall rule over him." Rav Isaac taught that a person's Evil Inclination renews itself against that person daily, as  says, "Every imagination of the thoughts of his heart was only evil every day." And Rabbi Simeon ben Levi (or others say Rabbi Simeon ben Lakish) taught that a person's Evil Inclination gathers strength against that person daily and seeks to slay that person, as  says, "The wicked watches the righteous, and seeks to slay him." And if God were not to help a person, one would not be able to prevail against one's Evil Inclination, for as  says, "The Lord will not leave him in his hand."

Rabbi Tarfon, Rabbi Akiva, and Rabbi Jose the Galilean were reclining at a meal in the house of Aris in Lydda when the question was presented to them of which is more important, learning or action. Rabbi Tarfon said action, Rabbi Akiva said learning, and then all responded that learning is more important, for learning brings about action. Rabbi Jose the Galilean argued that learning is more important, for the religious duty to learn the Torah came before the religious duty to separate dough–offering by 40 years, the obligation to separate tithes by 44 years, the obligation of the years of release by 61 years, and the obligation of the Jubilee Year by 103 years. And the Sifre taught that just as a more severe penalty pertains to neglect of learning than to neglect of doing required deeds, so a more abundant reward attaches to learning than to the doing of required deeds, for  says, “And you shall teach them your children, talking of them,” and  follows immediately, saying, “That your days may be multiplied, and the days of your children.”

Rabban Gamaliel cited  as an instance where the Torah alludes to life after death. The Gemara related that sectarians asked Rabban Gamaliel where Scripture says that God will resurrect the dead. Rabban Gamaliel answered them from the Torah, the Prophets (Nevi'im), and the Writings (Ketuvim), yet the sectarians did not accept his proofs. From the Torah, Rabban Gamaliel cited , "And the Lord said to Moses, ‘Behold, you shall sleep with your fathers and rise up [again].'" But the sectarians replied that perhaps  reads, "and the people will rise up." From the Prophets, Rabban Gamaliel cited , "Your dead men shall live, together with my dead body shall they arise. Awake and sing, you who dwell in the dust: for your dew is as the dew of herbs, and the earth shall cast out its dead." From the Writings, Rabban Gamaliel cited , "And the roof of your mouth, like the best wine of my beloved, that goes down sweetly, causing the lips of those who are asleep to speak." (As the Rabbis interpreted Song of Songs as a dialogue between God and Israel, they understood  to refer to the dead, whom God will cause to speak again.) But the sectarians rejoined that perhaps  means merely that the lips of the departed will move. For Rabbi Johanan said that if a halachah (legal ruling) is said in any person's name in this world, the person's lips speak in the grave, as  says, "causing the lips of those that are asleep to speak." Thus Rabban Gamaliel did not satisfy the sectarians until he quoted , "which the Lord swore to your fathers to give to them." Rabban Gamaliel noted that God swore to give the land not "to you" (the Israelites whom Moses addressed) but "to them" (the Patriarchs, who had long since died). And (the superfluous use of "this day" implies that) just as you are all alive today, so shall you all live again in the World To Come.

A Midrash asked to which commandment  refers when it says, "For if you shall diligently keep all this commandment that I command you, to do it, to love the Lord your God, to walk in all His ways, and to cleave to Him, then will the Lord drive out all these nations from before you, and you shall dispossess nations greater and mightier than yourselves." Rabbi Levi said that "this commandment" refers to the recitation of the Shema, but the Rabbis said that it refers to the Sabbath, which is equal to all the precepts of the Torah.

Similarly, Rabbi Hama son of Rabbi Hanina asked what  means in the text, "You shall walk after the Lord your God." How can a human being walk after God, when  says, "[T]he Lord your God is a devouring fire"? Rabbi Hama son of Rabbi Hanina explained that the command to walk after God means to walk after the attributes of God. As God clothes the naked — for  says, "And the Lord God made for Adam and for his wife coats of skin, and clothed them" — so should we also clothe the naked. God visited the sick — for  says, "And the Lord appeared to him by the oaks of Mamre" (after Abraham was circumcised in ) — so should we also visit the sick. God comforted mourners — for  says, "And it came to pass after the death of Abraham, that God blessed Isaac his son" — so should we also comfort mourners. God buried the dead — for  says, "And He buried him in the valley" — so should we also bury the dead.

In medieval Jewish interpretation
The parashah is discussed in these medieval Jewish sources:

Deuteronomy chapter 8

Baḥya ibn Paquda read , "That He might make known to you that man does not live by bread alone," to teach that those who trust in God have their sustenance assured by any of the means available in the world.

But Ibn Ezra rejected this explanation, arguing that the verse most probably refers to other desires that the Israelites could not fulfill in the wilderness.

Ibn Ezra read  to promise that God would reward the Israelites by bringing them into the Land, because they obeyed God, even though in order to chasten them, God afflicted them with thirst and hunger.

Reading , Hezekiah ben Manoah (the Hizkuni) lamented that the phenomenon of becoming haughty is tragically all too common. Reading , Bahya ben Asher taught that pride is the principal cause of forgetting essentials. Due to the abundance of affluence, peace, and tranquility, a person's heart can become haughty and smug, and the evil urge (yetzer hara) can find it easy to provoke a person to follow the heart without restraint. When that happens, Heaven's concerns become marginal. In , "and you say in your heart: ‘My strength and the power of my hand has gotten me this wealth,'" Bahya ben Asher read Moses to warn of the possibility that arrogance can lead one to ascribe affluence to one's own lucky stars. And reading , "you shall remember the Lord your God," Bahya ben Asher taught that God alone is the Source of good fortune, because God has given people the strength to perform deeds of valor, and has handed people the power to overcome bad fortune in their stars. Abraham ibn Ezra read Moses to warn the Israelites in  that they might forget that they were slaves with downcast hearts, forget the affliction and the hunger that they experienced in the wilderness, and forget that God sustained them nonetheless.

Baḥya suggested that this principle, in turn, might provide one possible reason for why some righteous people are prevented from obtaining their livelihood without effort and must instead exert themselves for it and be tested by it.

Rather, people should trust in God, and know that all means are equal for God. God can provide using whatever means and at any time and however God wishes.

Deuteronomy chapter 10
Maimonides and the siddur report that the Levites would recite the Psalm for the Day in the Temple.

But Baḥya cautioned that one must be careful not to take descriptions of God's attributes literally or in a physical sense. Rather, one must know that they are metaphors, geared to what we are capable of grasping with our powers of understanding, because of our urgent need to know God. But God is infinitely greater and loftier than all of these attributes.

Deuteronomy chapter 11
Maimonides cited  to support the proposition that it is a positive Torah commandment to pray every day, for  states: “You shall serve God, your Lord,” and tradition teaches that this service is prayer, as  says, “And serve Him with all your heart,” and our Sages said that the service of the heart is prayer.

In modern interpretation
The parashah is discussed in these modern sources:

Deuteronomy chapter 7

Deuteronomy chapter 8
The late 16th century Safed commentator Moshe Alshich noted that  appears to repeat , "Be careful lest you forget the Lord your God." Alshich explained that the evil urge (yetzer hara) works repetitively to subvert a person's character. The evil urge knows that it is easier to subvert successful people into believing in the success of their own efforts than to convince people of average means that they do not need God. Alshich taught that  thus reflects the way that the evil urge works. The process of moving away from serving God can be gradual, almost imperceptibly slow. It can start not by failing to observe the commandments, but by failing to see them as God's will. Thus  reflects that one can observe the commandments only for the sake of obtaining the reward that the Torah promises.  reflects the next step that one might eat and be satisfied without giving credit to God. After this, as  reports, one might give one's self credit for one's success. Moses thus warns against the insidious, indirect way that the evil urge attacks.

And the external circumstances that bring about success depend on God alone. Hirsch taught that the very smallest part of one's good fortune can be ascribed to one's own merit, and more is due to the merit of one's ancestors, whose virtues God rewards with their descendants' good fortune.

Reading , the 20th century Israeli scholar Nechama Leibowitz wrote that people in their blindness tend to detect the guiding hand of Providence only when manifested in visible miracles, as the Israelites witnessed in the wilderness. People fail to see the hidden miracles performed for them continually when the world around them seems to be going on as usual. For this reason, the formulators of the liturgy obliged Jews to give thanks three times daily (in the final benedictions of the Amidah prayer) "for Your miracles that are with us every day and for Your wonders and Your bounties that are at all times, evening, morning, and noon."

Deuteronomy chapter 10
The astronomer Carl Sagan reported that there are more stars in the universe than sands on all the beaches on the Earth.

Deuteronomy chapter 11
MacDonald wrote that the term for milk (chalav) could easily be the word for "fat" (chelev), and the word for honey (devash) could indicate not bees' honey but a sweet syrup made from fruit. The expression evoked a general sense of the bounty of the land and suggested an ecological richness exhibited in a number of ways, not just with milk and honey. MacDonald noted that the expression was always used to describe a land that the people of Israel had not yet experienced, and thus characterized it as always a future expectation.

Professor Donald Englert, who taught at the Lancaster Theological Seminary in the second half of the 20th century, suggested that “water with your foot” in  may have been a euphemism for “to urinate.”

The double "if-then" of  linked land and obedience, making the gift of the land conditional. And the negative "then" being drought, as rain is God's gift (see ; ; ; ; and ).

Commandments
According to Sefer ha-Chinuch, there are 6 positive and 2 negative commandments in the parashah.
Not to derive benefit from any ornamentation of an idol
Not to take any object from idolatry into our possession, to derive benefit from it
The precept of blessing the Almighty for the food we receive
The precept of love for converts to Judaism
The precept of reverent awe for the Eternal Lord
The precept of prayer to the Almighty
The mitzvah of associating with Torah scholars and adhering to them
That whoever needs to take an oath should swear by the Name of the Eternal Lord

In the liturgy
In the Blessing after Meals (Birkat Hamazon), Jews sometimes quote , the Scriptural basis for the Blessing after Meals, immediately before the invitation (zimun), and quote it again at the close of the second blessing (for the Land of Israel).

The Passover Haggadah, in the magid section of the Seder, quotes .

 is the second of three blocks of verses in the Shema, a central prayer in Jewish prayer services.

Haftarah
The haftarah is the second in the cycle of seven haftarot of consolation after Tisha B'Av, leading up to Rosh Hashanah.

Notes

Further reading
The parashah has parallels or is discussed in these sources:

Biblical
 (blessings of health and fertility);  (driving out the Canaanites);  (the Golden Calf); .
; .
;  (blessings).
.

 (circumcise your heart).
 (God loves);  (God's loving kindness);  (remember God's wonders);  (their idols became a snare);  (God led the people through the wilderness);  (God loves).

Early nonrabbinic
Pliny the Elder. Natural History 26:3, 5 1st Century C.E. (Egyptian diseases).
Josephus. Antiquities of the Jews 4:8:2–3 . Circa 93–94. In, e.g., The Works of Josephus: Complete and Unabridged, New Updated Edition. Translated by William Whiston. Peabody, Massachusetts: Hendrickson Publishers, 1987. .
Matthew  (not live by bread alone).

Classical rabbinic
Mishnah: Berakhot 1:1–3:6; Bikkurim 1:3; Sotah 7:8; Avodah Zarah 1:9, 3:1–10; Tamid 5:1. Land of Israel, circa 200 C.E. In, e.g., The Mishnah: A New Translation. Translated by Jacob Neusner, pages 3–7, 167, 458–59, 662, 664–67, 869. New Haven: Yale University Press, 1988. .
Sifre to Deuteronomy 37:1–52:1. Land of Israel, circa 250–350 C.E. In, e.g., Sifre to Deuteronomy: An Analytical Translation. Translated by Jacob Neusner. Atlanta: Scholars Press, 1987. .
Tosefta: Berakhot 1:1–2:21; 4:15; 6:1; Sotah 7:17; 8:10; Avodah Zarah 3:19; 5:6; 6:13; Zavim 5:6. Land of Israel, circa 250 CE. In, e.g., The Tosefta: Translated from the Hebrew, with a New Introduction. Translated by Jacob Neusner, volume 1, pages 3–13, 25, 36, 864, 871; volume 2, pages 1273, 1280, 1285, 1898. Peabody, Massachusetts: Hendrickson Publishers, 2002. .
Jerusalem Talmud: Berakhot 1a–42b, 72b, 88b; Peah 23a; Kilayim 30a; Sheviit 42b; Terumot 12a; Challah 18b; Shabbat 69b, 70a, 92a; Eruvin 63b; Pesachim 28a; Yoma 2b, 5b, 50b; Sukkah 20b; Rosh Hashanah 10a; Taanit 3a, 16b, 22b, 26a; Megillah 16a, 33a, 34a–b; Ketubot 38b; Sotah 8b, 37a, 38a, 39b; Kiddushin 19b, 21b, 22b; Sanhedrin 36a, 62b, 64a; Makkot 6a; Avodah Zarah 7a, 17b–24a, 25a–b, 29b. Tiberias, Land of Israel, circa 400 CE. In, e.g., Talmud Yerushalmi. Edited by Chaim Malinowitz, Yisroel Simcha Schorr, and Mordechai Marcus, volumes 1–3, 5, 6b–7, 11, 14–15, 17–18, 21–22, 24–25, 31, 36–37, 40, 44–45, 47–49. Brooklyn: Mesorah Publications, 2005–2020. And in, e.g., The Jerusalem Talmud: A Translation and Commentary. Edited by Jacob Neusner and translated by Jacob Neusner, Tzvee Zahavy, B. Barry Levy, and Edward Goldman. Peabody, Massachusetts: Hendrickson Publishers, 2009.
Genesis Rabbah 8:10; 21:6; 32:5, 10; 38:9; 44:17; 48:10, 14; 49:2; 53:4; 70:5. Land of Israel, 5th century. In, e.g., Midrash Rabbah: Genesis. Translated by Harry Freedman and Maurice Simon, volume 1, pages 105, 175–76, 252, 255, 308, 372–73, 411–12, 415, 420, 463–64; volume 2, pages 604, 638. London: Soncino Press, 1939. .

Babylonian Talmud: Berakhot 2a–26a, 32a–b, 33b–34a, 35a–b, 36b–37a, 38a, 40a–41b, 44a, 48b, 51b, 55a; Shabbat 31b, 32b, 82b, 105b, 108a; Eruvin 4a; Pesachim 36a, 49b, 53a, 87b, 101b, 104a, 119a; Yoma 3b, 11b, 69b, 72b, 74b, 75b, 79b, 81b; Sukkah 5b, 26b, 35a, 52a; Rosh Hashanah 7a, 8a–b, 17b; Taanit 2a, 3b–4a, 6a–b, 7b, 9b, 26b; Megillah 19b, 21a, 25a, 31a; Chagigah 12a–b; Yevamot 72a, 78b; Ketubot 12, 47b, 102b, 111a–12a; Nedarim 7b, 32a, 38a; Sotah 4b–5a, 11a, 14a, 33a, 36a; Gittin 62a; Kiddushin 9b, 29b–30b, 36a, 58a; Bava Kamma 113b; Bava Metzia 59b; Bava Batra 9b, 14b, 19a, 21a, 110b, 121a, 167b; Sanhedrin 4b, 56a, 90b, 93a, 99a, 102b, 110a, 113a; Makkot 7b; Shevuot 30b; Avodah Zarah 15a, 21a, 40b–49b, 52a, 54b; Horayot 13a; Zevachim 16a; Menachot 28b, 31b, 37b, 43b, 84a–b, 99a; Chullin 84b, 120b, 135b, 140a; Bekhorot 6b, 44b; Arakhin 4a; Temurah 3b, 28b, 30b; Tamid 32b; Niddah 16b, 70b. Sasanian Empire, 6th Century. In, e.g., Talmud Bavli. Edited by Yisroel Simcha Schorr, Chaim Malinowitz, and Mordechai Marcus, 72 volumes. Brooklyn: Mesorah Pubs., 2006.
Midrash Proverbs, chapter 23. 8th century. In, e.g., The Midrash on Proverbs. Translated with an introduction and annotations by Burton L. Visotzky, page 101. New Haven: Yale University Press, 1992. .

Medieval
Rashi. Commentary. Deuteronomy 7–11. Troyes, France, late 11th Century. In, e.g., Rashi. The Torah: With Rashi's Commentary Translated, Annotated, and Elucidated. Translated and annotated by Yisrael Isser Zvi Herczeg, volume 5, pages 83–118. Brooklyn: Mesorah Publications, 1997. .
Rashbam. Commentary on the Torah. Troyes, early 12th century. In, e.g., Rashbam's Commentary on Deuteronomy: An Annotated Translation. Edited and translated by Martin I. Lockshin, pages 69–84. Providence, Rhode Island: Brown Judaic Studies, 2004. .

Judah Halevi. Kuzari. 1:97; 2:14, 47–48, 56. Toledo, Spain, 1130–1140. In, e.g., Jehuda Halevi. Kuzari: An Argument for the Faith of Israel. Introduction by Henry Slonimsky, pages 68–69, 89, 111–12, 119. New York: Schocken, 1964. .
Abraham ibn Ezra. Commentary on the Torah. Mid-12th century. In, e.g., Ibn Ezra's Commentary on the Pentateuch: Deuteronomy (Devarim). Translated and annotated by H. Norman Strickman and Arthur M. Silver, volume 5, pages 55–77. New York: Menorah Publishing Company, 2001. .
Benjamin of Tudela. The Itinerary of Benjamin of Tudela. Spain, 1173. In The Itinerary of Benjamin of Tudela: Travels in the Middle Ages. Introductions by Michael A. Singer, Marcus Nathan Adler, A. Asher, page 91. Malibu, California: Joseph Simon, 1983. . (Anak).
Maimonides. Mishneh Torah: Hilchot De'ot (The Laws of Personality Development), chapter 1, halachah 4; chapter 2, halachah 3; chapter 6, halachot 2, 4; Hilchot Talmud Torah (The Laws of Torah Study), chapter 1, halachot 1, 6, 8; chapter 3, halachot 5, 13. Egypt, circa 1170–1180. In, e.g., Mishneh Torah: Hilchot De'ot: The Laws of Personality Development: and Hilchot Talmud Torah: The Laws of Torah Study. Translated by Za'ev Abramson and Eliyahu Touger, volume 2, pages 18–23, 36–43, 118–23, 158–59, 168–70, 164–65, 192–95, 206–09. New York: Moznaim Publishing, 1989.   (1991).

Maimonides. Mishneh Torah: Hilchot Avodat Kochavim V'Chukkoteihem (The Laws of the Worship of Stars and their Statutes), chapter 2, halachah 1; chapter 7; chapter 8, halachah 7; chapter 10, halachah 4. Egypt, circa 1170–1180. In, e.g., Mishneh Torah: Hilchot Avodat Kochavim V'Chukkoteihem: The Laws of the Worship of Stars and their Statutes.Translated by Eliyahu Touger, volume 3, pages 30–33, 112–45, 158–59, 190–93. New York: Moznaim Publishing, 1990.  .
Maimonides. Mishneh Torah: Hilchot Teshuvah (The Laws of Repentance), chapter 3, halachah 2; chapter 4, halachah 2; chapter 9, halachah 1; chapter 10, halachah 4. Egypt, circa 1170–1180. In, e.g., Mishneh Torah: Hilchot Teshuvah: The Laws of Repentance. Translated by Eliyahu Touger, volume 4, pages 50–55, 96–103, 200–11, 224–27. New York: Moznaim Publishing, 1990.   .
Maimonides. Mishneh Torah: Hilchot Kri'at Shema (The Laws of Kri'at Shema), chapter 1, halachah 2; chapter 2, halachah 9; Hilchot Tefilah (The Laws of Prayer), chapter 1, halachah 1; chapter 5, halachot 2, 13. Egypt, circa 1170–1180. In, e.g., Mishneh Torah: Hilchot Kri'at Shema: The Laws of Kri'at Shema: and Hilchot Tefilah [I]: The Laws of Prayer. Translated by Eliyahu Touger, volume 5, pages 12–15, 40–43, 96–98, 180–83, 198–201. New York: Moznaim Publishing, 1989.
Maimonides. Mishneh Torah: Hilchot Tefilah (The Laws of Prayer), chapter 7, halachah 14; chapter 9, halachah 7; chapter 12, halachah 12; chapter 14, halachot 1, 12; chapter 15, halachah 3. Egypt, circa 1170–1180. In, e.g., Mishneh Torah: Tefilah [II]: and Birkat Kohanim: The Laws of Prayer and the Priestly Blessing. Translated by Eliyahu Touger, volume 6, pages 34–37, 72–75, 144–47, 188–89, 204–07, 212–15. New York: Moznaim Publishing, 1989.
Maimonides. Mishneh Torah: Hilchot Tefillin UMezuzah V'Sefer Torah (The Laws (Governing) Tefillin, Mezuzah, and Torah Scrolls), chapter 1, halachot 1–2; chapter 2, halachot 1–2, 7, 9; chapter 3, halachah 5; chapter 5, halachot 2–3. Egypt, circa 1170–1180. In, e.g., Mishneh Torah: Hilchot Tefillin UMezuzah V'Sefer Torah: The Laws (Governing) Tefillin, Mezuzah, and Torah Scrolls: and Hilchot Tzitzit: The Laws of Tzitzit. Translated by Eliyahu Touger, volume 7, pages 12–14, 38–41, 44–47, 54–57, 102–05. New York: Moznaim Publishing, 1990.
Maimonides. Mishneh Torah: Hilchot Berachot (The Laws of Blessings), chapter 1, halachah 1; chapter 2, halachot 1, 3; chapter 3, halachah 1; chapter 5, halachot 1, 10; chapter 7, halachah 4; chapter 8, halachot 1, 4, 13. Egypt, circa 1170–1180. In, e.g., Mishneh Torah: Hilchot Berachot: The Laws of Blessing: and Hilchot Milah: The Laws of Circumcision. Translated by Eliyahu Touger, volume 8, pages 12–13, 34–41, 54–57, 84–85, 92–93, 122–23, 130–35, 142–43. New York: Moznaim Publishing, 1991.
Maimonides. The Guide for the Perplexed, part 1, chapters 36–37, 44; part 2, chapters 9, 39; part 3, chapters 17, 24, 28–29, 32–33, 37, 39, 50–51. Cairo, Egypt, 1190. In, e.g., Moses Maimonides. The Guide for the Perplexed. Translated by Michael Friedländer, pages 50, 53, 58, 163, 232, 286, 304–05, 314, 318, 320, 323, 325, 327, 335–36, 340, 382, 386. New York: Dover Publications, 1956. .
Hezekiah ben Manoah. Hizkuni. France, circa 1240. In, e.g., Chizkiyahu ben Manoach. Chizkuni: Torah Commentary. Translated and annotated by Eliyahu Munk, volume 4, pages 1083–94. Jerusalem: Ktav Publishers, 2013. .

Nachmanides. Commentary on the Torah. Jerusalem, circa 1270. In, e.g., Ramban (Nachmanides): Commentary on the Torah: Deuteronomy. Translated by Charles B. Chavel, volume 5, pages 94–138. New York: Shilo Publishing House, 1976. .
Zohar part 3, pages 270a–. Spain, late 13th Century. In, e.g., The Zohar. Translated by Harry Sperling and Maurice Simon. 5 volumes. London: Soncino Press, 1934.
Bahya ben Asher. Commentary on the Torah. Spain, early 14th century. In, e.g., Midrash Rabbeinu Bachya: Torah Commentary by Rabbi Bachya ben Asher. Translated and annotated by Eliyahu Munk, volume 7, pages 2445–99. Jerusalem: Lambda Publishers, 2003. .
Isaac ben Moses Arama. Akedat Yizhak (The Binding of Isaac). Late 15th century. In, e.g., Yitzchak Arama. Akeydat Yitzchak: Commentary of Rabbi Yitzchak Arama on the Torah. Translated and condensed by Eliyahu Munk, volume 2, pages 821–35. New York, Lambda Publishers, 2001. .

Modern
Isaac Abravanel. Commentary on the Torah. Italy, between 1492 and 1509. In, e.g., Abarbanel: Selected Commentaries on the Torah: Volume 5: Devarim/Deuteronomy. Translated and annotated by Israel Lazar, pages 46–63. Brooklyn: CreateSpace, 2015. .
Obadiah ben Jacob Sforno. Commentary on the Torah. Venice, 1567. In, e.g., Sforno: Commentary on the Torah. Translation and explanatory notes by Raphael Pelcovitz, pages 870–91. Brooklyn: Mesorah Publications, 1997. .

Moshe Alshich. Commentary on the Torah. Safed, circa 1593. In, e.g., Moshe Alshich. Midrash of Rabbi Moshe Alshich on the Torah. Translated and annotated by Eliyahu Munk, volume 3, pages 993–1016. New York, Lambda Publishers, 2000. .
Thomas Hobbes. Leviathan, 2:26; 3:40; 4:45. England, 1651. Reprint edited by C. B. Macpherson, pages 319, 504–05, 672, 676–77. Harmondsworth, England: Penguin Classics, 1982. .

Moshe Chaim Luzzatto. Mesillat Yesharim, introduction. Amsterdam, 1740. In Mesillat Yesharim: The Path of the Just, pages 9–13. Jerusalem: Feldheim, 1966. . (Interpreting ).
Chaim ibn Attar. Ohr ha-Chaim. Venice, 1742. In Chayim ben Attar. Or Hachayim: Commentary on the Torah. Translated by Eliyahu Munk, volume 5, pages 1818–43. Brooklyn: Lambda Publishers, 1999. .
Samson Raphael Hirsch. Horeb: A Philosophy of Jewish Laws and Observances. Translated by Isidore Grunfeld, pages 35–43, 47–50, 175–80, 187–89, 376–77, 406–16, 448–52, 471–78, 525–30, 544–47, 565–67. London: Soncino Press, 1962. Reprinted 2002 . Originally published as Horeb, Versuche über Jissroel's Pflichten in der Zerstreuung. Germany, 1837.

George Eliot. Adam Bede, chapter 8. Edinburgh and London: William Blackwood and Sons, 1859. Reprinted, e.g., edited by Carol A. Martin, page 81. Oxford: Oxford University Press, 2008. (echoing , Dinah describes Hayslope as “a good land, wherein they eat bread without scarceness.”).
Samuel David Luzzatto (Shadal). Commentary on the Torah. Padua, 1871. In, e.g., Samuel David Luzzatto. Torah Commentary. Translated and annotated by Eliyahu Munk, volume 4, pages 1174–82. New York: Lambda Publishers, 2012. .

Yehudah Aryeh Leib Alter. Sefat Emet. Góra Kalwaria (Ger), Poland, before 1906. Excerpted in The Language of Truth: The Torah Commentary of Sefat Emet. Translated and interpreted by Arthur Green, pages 295–99. Philadelphia: Jewish Publication Society, 1998. . Reprinted 2012. .
Abraham Isaac Kook. The Moral Principles. Early 20th Century. In Abraham Isaac Kook: the Lights of Penitence, the Moral Principles, Lights of Holiness, Essays, Letters, and Poems. Translated by Ben Zion Bokser, page 176. Mahwah, N.J.: Paulist Press 1978. .

Hermann Cohen. Religion of Reason: Out of the Sources of Judaism. Translated with an introduction by Simon Kaplan; introductory essays by Leo Strauss, pages 79, 127, 145, 263, 382. New York: Ungar, 1972. Reprinted Atlanta: Scholars Press, 1995. . Originally published as Religion der Vernunft aus den Quellen des Judentums. Leipzig: Gustav Fock, 1919.
Alexander Alan Steinbach. Sabbath Queen: Fifty-four Bible Talks to the Young Based on Each Portion of the Pentateuch, pages 145–48. New York: Behrman's Jewish Book House, 1936.
Joseph Reider. The Holy Scriptures: Deuteronomy with Commentary, pages 84–115. Philadelphia: Jewish Publication Society, 1937.
Thomas Mann. Joseph and His Brothers. Translated by John E. Woods, page 788. New York: Alfred A. Knopf, 2005. . Originally published as Joseph und seine Brüder. Stockholm: Bermann-Fischer Verlag, 1943.
Abraham Joshua Heschel. Man's Quest for God: Studies in Prayer and Symbolism, page 36. New York: Charles Scribner's Sons, 1954.

Bob Dylan. "Gates of Eden." In Bringing It All Back Home. Columbia Records, 1965. ("Aladdin and his lamp sits with Utopian hermit monks side saddle on the Golden Calf").
Martin Buber. On the Bible: Eighteen studies, pages 80–92. New York: Schocken Books, 1968.
Peter C. Craigie. The Problem of War in the Old Testament, pages 45, 47. Grand Rapids, Michigan: William B. Eerdmans Publishing Company, 1978. .
Nehama Leibowitz. Studies in Devarim: Deuteronomy, pages 85–119. Jerusalem: World Zionist Organization, 1980.
Lyle Eslinger. “Watering Egypt (Deuteronomy XI 10–11).” Vetus Testamentum, volume 37, number 1) (January 1987): pages 85–90.
Pinchas H. Peli. Torah Today: A Renewed Encounter with Scripture, pages 209–12. Washington, D.C.: B'nai B'rith Books, 1987. .
George G. Nicol. “Watering Egypt (Deuteronomy XI 10–11) Again.” Vetus Testamentum, volume 38, number 3 (July 1988): pages 347–48.
Patrick D. Miller. Deuteronomy, pages 110–28. Louisville: John Knox Press, 1990.
Robert H. O'Connell. “Deuteronomy VIII 1–20: Asymmetrical Concentricity and the Rhetoric of Providence.” Vetus Testamentum, volume 40, number 4 (October 1990): pages 437–52.
Mark S. Smith. The Early History of God: Yahweh and the Other Deities in Ancient Israel, pages 18, 152. New York: HarperSanFrancisco, 1990. .
Philip D. Stern. The Biblical Herem: A Window on Israel's Religious Experience. Atlanta: Scholars Press, 1991. .
Moshe Weinfeld. Deuteronomy 1–11, volume 5, pages 357–455. New York: Anchor Bible, 1991. .
Robert H. O'Connell. “Deuteronomy VII 1–26: Asymmetrical Concentricity and the Rhetoric of Conquest.” Vetus Testamentum, volume 42, number 2 (April 1992): pages 248–65.
Robert H. O'Connell. “Deuteronomy IX 7–X 7, 10–11: Panelled Structure, Double Rehearsal and the Rhetoric of Covenant Rebuke.” Vetus Testamentum, volume 42, number 4 (October 1992): pages 492–509.
Joel Roth. "Homosexuality." New York: Rabbinical Assembly, 1992. EH 24.1992b. In Responsa: 1991–2000: The Committee on Jewish Law and Standards of the Conservative Movement. Edited by Kassel Abelson and David J. Fine, pages 613, 615. New York: Rabbinical Assembly, 2002. . (interpreting the term "abhorrence").
A Song of Power and the Power of Song: Essays on the Book of Deuteronomy. Edited by Duane L. Christensen. Winona Lake, Indiana: Eisenbrauns, 1993. .
Elliot N. Dorff. "Artificial Insemination, Egg Donation and Adoption." New York: Rabbinical Assembly, 1994. EH 1:3.1994. In Responsa: 1991–2000: The Committee on Jewish Law and Standards of the Conservative Movement. Edited by Kassel Abelson and David J. Fine, pages 461, 462, 464. New York: Rabbinical Assembly, 2002. . (children among life's chief goods).
Neil Gillman. Sacred Fragments: Recovering Theology for the Modern Jew, pages xxiv-xxv. Philadelphia: Jewish Publication Society, 1994. . (arguing that for many Jews, the traditional images that characterized Judaism are like the irreparably shattered Tablets, and modern Jews must carve out their new set of interpretations, without discarding the old).
Judith S. Antonelli. "The Asherah." In In the Image of God: A Feminist Commentary on the Torah, pages 416–27. Northvale, New Jersey: Jason Aronson, 1995. .
Jacob Milgrom. "‘The Alien in Your Midst': Every nation has its ger: the permanent resident. The Torah commands us, first, not to oppress the ger, and then to befriend and love him." Bible Review, volume 11, number 6 (December 1995).
Ellen Frankel. The Five Books of Miriam: A Woman’s Commentary on the Torah, pages 258–60. New York: G. P. Putnam's Sons, 1996. .

Jack R. Lundbom. “The Inclusio and Other Framing Devices in Deuteronomy I–XXVIII.” Vetus Testamentum, volume 46, number 3 (July 1996): pages 296–315.
W. Gunther Plaut. The Haftarah Commentary, pages 451–62. New York: UAHC Press, 1996. .
Jeffrey H. Tigay. The JPS Torah Commentary: Deuteronomy: The Traditional Hebrew Text with the New JPS Translation, pages 88–115, 438–46. Philadelphia: Jewish Publication Society, 1996. .
Elliot N. Dorff. "Assisted Suicide." New York: Rabbinical Assembly, 1997. YD 345.1997a. In Responsa: 1991–2000: The Committee on Jewish Law and Standards of the Conservative Movement. Edited by Kassel Abelson and David J. Fine, pages 379, 380. New York: Rabbinical Assembly, 2002. . (implications for assisted suicide of God's ownership of the universe).
Sorel Goldberg Loeb and Barbara Binder Kadden. Teaching Torah: A Treasury of Insights and Activities, pages 304–09. Denver: A.R.E. Publishing, 1997. .
"Sh'ma." In My People's Prayer Book: Traditional Prayers, Modern Commentaries: The Sh'ma and Its Blessings. Edited by Lawrence A. Hoffman, volume 1, pages 83–116. Woodstock, Vermont: Jewish Lights Publishing, 1997. .
Elie Kaplan Spitz. "On the Use of Birth Surrogates." New York: Rabbinical Assembly, 1997. EH 1:3.1997b. In Responsa: 1991–2000: The Committee on Jewish Law and Standards of the Conservative Movement. Edited by Kassel Abelson and David J. Fine, pages 529, 536. New York: Rabbinical Assembly, 2002. . (promise of abundant offspring).
Susan Freeman. Teaching Jewish Virtues: Sacred Sources and Arts Activities, pages 8–25, 332–46. Springfield, New Jersey: A.R.E. Publishing, 1999. ..
Richard D. Nelson. “Deuteronomy.” In The HarperCollins Bible Commentary. Edited by James L. Mays, pages 195–96, 198–200. New York: HarperCollins Publishers, revised edition, 2000. .
Gila Colman Ruskin. "Circumcision, Womb, and Spiritual Intimacy." In The Women's Torah Commentary: New Insights from Women Rabbis on the 54 Weekly Torah Portions. Edited by Elyse Goldstein, pages 345–50. Woodstock, Vermont: Jewish Lights Publishing, 2000. .
Walter Brueggemann. Abingdon Old Testament Commentaries: Deuteronomy, pages 93–141. Nashville, Tennessee: Abingdon Press, 2001. .
Lainie Blum Cogan and Judy Weiss. Teaching Haftarah: Background, Insights, and Strategies, pages 295–303. Denver: A.R.E. Publishing, 2002. .
Michael Fishbane. The JPS Bible Commentary: Haftarot, pages 284–91. Philadelphia: Jewish Publication Society, 2002. .
Robert Alter. The Five Books of Moses: A Translation with Commentary, pages 918–38. New York: W.W. Norton & Co., 2004. .
Lynne A. Kern. “Haftarat Ekev: Isaiah 49:14–51:3.” In The Women's Haftarah Commentary: New Insights from Women Rabbis on the 54 Weekly Haftarah Portions, the 5 Megillot & Special Shabbatot. Edited by Elyse Goldstein, pages 221–26. Woodstock, Vermont: Jewish Lights Publishing, 2004. .
Bernard M. Levinson. "Deuteronomy." In The Jewish Study Bible. Edited by Adele Berlin and Marc Zvi Brettler, pages 383–90. New York: Oxford University Press, 2004. .
Professors on the Parashah: Studies on the Weekly Torah Reading Edited by Leib Moscovitz, pages 311–13. Jerusalem: Urim Publications, 2005. .
W. Gunther Plaut. The Torah: A Modern Commentary: Revised Edition. Revised edition edited by David E.S. Stern, pages 1226–54. New York: Union for Reform Judaism, 2006. .
Suzanne A. Brody. "Fall-able." In Dancing in the White Spaces: The Yearly Torah Cycle and More Poems, page 104. Shelbyville, Kentucky: Wasteland Press, 2007. .

Esther Jungreis. Life Is a Test, pages 18, 128, 208, 261–62. Brooklyn: Shaar Press, 2007. .
James L. Kugel. How To Read the Bible: A Guide to Scripture, Then and Now, pages 193, 246, 311, 313, 333, 353–55, 369, 532, 621, 685. New York: Free Press, 2007. .
Dmitri Slivniak. “The Golden Calf Story: Constructively and Deconstructively.” Journal for the Study of the Old Testament, volume 33, number 1 (September 2008): pages 19–38.
The Torah: A Women's Commentary. Edited by Tamara Cohn Eskenazi and Andrea L. Weiss, pages 1089–114. New York: URJ Press, 2008. .
Eugene E. Carpenter. "Deuteronomy." In Zondervan Illustrated Bible Backgrounds Commentary. Edited by John H. Walton, volume 1, pages 463–69. Grand Rapids, Michigan: Zondervan, 2009. .

Ari Lev Fornari. "Bind These Words: Parashat Ekev (Deuteronomy 7:12–11:25)." In Torah Queeries: Weekly Commentaries on the Hebrew Bible. Edited by Gregg Drinkwater, Joshua Lesser, and David Shneer; foreword by Judith Plaskow, pages 240–45. New York: New York University Press, 2009. .
Jonathan Goldstein. "The Golden Calf." In Ladies and Gentlemen, the Bible! pages 115–28. New York: Riverhead Books, 2009. .
Reuven Hammer. Entering Torah: Prefaces to the Weekly Torah Portion, pages 263–67. New York: Gefen Publishing House, 2009. .
Idan Dershowitz. “A Land Flowing with Fat and Honey.” Vetus Testamentum, volume 60, number 2 (2010): pages 172–76.
Julie Cadwallader-Staub. Joy. In Face to Face: A Poetry Collection. DreamSeeker Books, 2010. . ("land of milk and honey").
Bill T. Arnold. “The Love-Fear Antinomy in Deuteronomy 5–11.” Vetus Testamentum, volume 61, number 4 (2011): pages 551–69.

William G. Dever. The Lives of Ordinary People in Ancient Israel: When Archaeology and the Bible Intersect, pages 43, 46, 192–93. Grand Rapids, Michigan: William B. Eerdmans Publishing Company, 2012. .
Shmuel Herzfeld. "The Fragile Relationship." In Fifty-Four Pick Up: Fifteen-Minute Inspirational Torah Lessons, pages 262–67. Jerusalem: Gefen Publishing House, 2012. .
Jaclyn Neel. “Diodorus, Deuteronomy, and Egyptian Agriculture.” Vetus Testamentum, volume 62, number 4 (2012): pages 646–51.

Jonathan Cohen. “Keeping the balance: Between self-congratulation and self-criticism.” The Jerusalem Report, volume 25, number 10 (August 25, 2014): page 47.
Shlomo Riskin. Torah Lights: Devarim: Moses Bequeaths Legacy, History, and Covenant, pages 75–105. New Milford, Connecticut: Maggid Books, 2014. .
The Commentators' Bible: The Rubin JPS Miqra'ot Gedolot: Deuteronomy. Edited, translated, and annotated by Michael Carasik, pages 56–81. Philadelphia: Jewish Publication Society, 2015. .

Jonathan Sacks. Lessons in Leadership: A Weekly Reading of the Jewish Bible, pages 251–55. New Milford, Connecticut: Maggid Books, 2015. .
Jonathan Sacks. Essays on Ethics: A Weekly Reading of the Jewish Bible, pages 287–91. New Milford, Connecticut: Maggid Books, 2016. .
Shai Held. The Heart of Torah, Volume 2: Essays on the Weekly Torah Portion: Leviticus, Numbers, and Deuteronomy, pages 220–29. Philadelphia: Jewish Publication Society, 2017. .
Steven Levy and Sarah Levy. The JPS Rashi Discussion Torah Commentary, pages 156–59. Philadelphia: Jewish Publication Society, 2017. .
Pekka Pitkänen. “Ancient Israelite Population Economy: Ger, Toshav, Nakhri and Karat as Settler Colonial Categories.” Journal for the Study of the Old Testament, volume 42, number 2 (December 2017): pages 139–53.
Ernst Wendland. Deuteronomy: translationNotes. Orlando, Florida: unfoldingWord, 2017.
Pallant Ramsundar. “Biblical Mistranslations to 'Euphrates' and the Impact on the Borders of Israel.” American Journal of Biblical Theology (2019).
Jonathan Sacks. Covenant & Conversation: A Weekly Reading of the Jewish Bible: Deuteronomy: Renewal of the Sinai Covenant, pages 85–115. New Milford, Connecticut: Maggid Books, 2019.
Andrew Tobolowsky. "The Problem of Reubenite Primacy: New Paradigms, New Answers." Journal of Biblical Literature, volume 139, number 1 (2020): pages 27–45.

External links

Texts
Masoretic text and 1917 JPS translation
Hear the parashah chanted 
Hear the parashah read in Hebrew

Commentaries

Academy for Jewish Religion, New York
Aish.com 
Akhlah: The Jewish Children's Learning Network 
Aleph Beta Academy
American Jewish University - Ziegler School of Rabbinic Studies
Anshe Emes Synagogue, Los Angeles 
Ari Goldwag
Ascent of Safed
Bar-Ilan University 
Chabad.org
eparsha.com
G-dcast
The Israel Koschitzky Virtual Beit Midrash
Jewish Agency for Israel
Jewish Theological Seminary
Kabbala Online
Mechon Hadar
Miriam Aflalo
MyJewishLearning.com
Ohr Sameach
Orthodox Union
OzTorah, Torah from Australia
Oz Ve Shalom — Netivot Shalom
Pardes from Jerusalem
Professor James L. Kugel
Professor Michael Carasik 
Rabbi Dov Linzer
Rabbi Jonathan Sacks
RabbiShimon.com 
Rabbi Shlomo Riskin
Rabbi Shmuel Herzfeld
Rabbi Stan Levin 
Reconstructionist Judaism 
Sephardic Institute
Shiur.com
613.org Jewish Torah Audio
Tanach Study Center
Teach613.org, Torah Education at Cherry Hill
TheTorah.com
Torah from Dixie 
Torah.org
TorahVort.com
Union for Reform Judaism
United Synagogue of Conservative Judaism 
What's Bothering Rashi?
Yeshivat Chovevei Torah
Yeshiva University

Weekly Torah readings in Av
Weekly Torah readings from Deuteronomy